"Shout" is 2010 single by Shout for England, an ensemble featuring Dizzee Rascal and James Corden. It was an unofficial anthem of the England football team for the 2010 FIFA World Cup in South Africa. The song contains extracts from the Tears for Fears song of the same name and "No Diggity" by Blackstreet and features additional lyrics written by Rascal. It was published by Syco Music in association with the telecommunications company TalkTalk.

Live Performances & Shout 2012   
"Shout" was first performed on the Series 4 finale of Britain's Got Talent on 5 June 2010 and at the Summertime Ball at Wembley Stadium the following day, ahead of its download release on 9 June. The CD single was released on 16 June. An updated version of the track was released for the UEFA Euro 2012 on 20 June 2012. It included references to England players such as Wayne Rooney and Ashley Cole.

Chart performance
"Shout" debuted at number 1 on the UK Singles Chart on 13 June 2010, based on download sales alone, beating competition from "Frisky" by Tinie Tempah and fellow World Cup song "Wavin' Flag (The Celebration Mix)" by K'naan. It sold well over 100,000 copies in its first chart week despite only being available for four days (its download was released on Wednesday, and the UK chart surveys from Sunday to Saturday). All royalties from the single went to Great Ormond Street Hospital. On 17 June it entered the Irish singles chart at 41. The song spent a second week atop the chart on 20 June. The song was knocked off the top spot by Katy Perry's "California Gurls" on 27 June. A remix of the song was released on 20 June 2012 for the Euros 2012 and peaked at number 43 on the UK iTunes chart.

References

2010 songs
2010 singles
Dizzee Rascal songs
James Corden songs
Songs written by Roland Orzabal
UK Singles Chart number-one singles
Song recordings produced by Ray Hedges
Songs written by Ray Hedges
Songs written by Teddy Riley
Songs written by Bill Withers
England national football team songs
England at the 2010 FIFA World Cup
Songs written by Nigel Butler
Songs written by Ian Stanley
Songs written by Dizzee Rascal
Syco Music singles